Roeg is a surname. Notable people with this surname include:

 Johnny Roeg (1910–2003), Dutch footballer
 Nicolas Roeg (1928–2018), English director

See also
 Roen (surname)